Mikhail Yuryevich Khlebalin (born 16 April 1970) is a retired Russian professional footballer.

Khlebalin made 37 appearances in the 1991 Soviet Second League with Torpedo Lyubertsy.

Khlebalin made 14 appearances and scored one goal in the Croatian First Football League in the seasons 1996–97 and 1998–99 with NK Varteks.

References

1970 births
Living people
Soviet footballers
Russian footballers
Russian expatriate footballers
Association football forwards
Expatriate footballers in Slovenia
NK Mura players
Expatriate footballers in Croatia
NK Varaždin players
FC Torpedo Moscow players